Palm Beach is a suburb in the Northern Beaches region of Sydney, in the state of New South Wales, Australia. Palm Beach sits on a peninsula at the end of Barrenjoey Road, between Pittwater and Broken Bay.

Palm Beach is sometimes colloquially referred to as 'Palmy'; and is used for exterior filming of the soap opera Home and Away, as the fictional town of Summer Bay. It is also the subject of the 2018 film 'Palm Beach'. Despite the hefty property prices it remains a haven for a variety of artists. Writing celebrating this beach is featured in "Guide to Sydney Beaches" Meuse Press. Palm Beach housing ranges from cottages to grand estates, owned by some of the country's most affluent people. Many affluent and famous people can also be found holidaying at Palm Beach in summer. According to the Australian Taxation Office statistics for the financial year of 2016–2017, Palm Beach and the post code of 2108 was the wealthiest suburb in Australia, with an average taxable income of $230,000.

Geography
Palm Beach is bounded by Broken Bay to the north, the Tasman Sea (within the South Pacific Ocean) to the east, Whale Beach, Avalon and Clareville to the south, and Pittwater to the west. Barrenjoey Headland, which is in the north of the suburb, is part of Ku-ring-gai Chase National Park. The narrow sandy isthmus or tombolo linking the south side of the headland to the rest of Palm Beach had extensive fencing and shrub planting undertaken during the 1980s to combat sand erosion.

Localities
The suburb of Palm Beach also contains the following localities: Barrenjoey, Sand Point, Careel Bay, Paradise Beach, and North Avalon.

Reserves and bushland
Along the cliffs and sanddunes there is much remnant bushland vegetation, located in reserves and national parks, with Barrenjoey headland being part of Ku-ring-gai Chase National Park. These reserves often contain endangered ecological communities, such as Littoral Rainforest, and Pittwater spotted gum forest. See, for example, the articles, McKay Reserve, and Barrenjoey.

Landmarks

Landmarks include the Barrenjoey Lighthouse, Palm Beach-Boanbong Water Reservoir, Palm Beach-McKay Water Reservoir, Palm Beach-Squaters Lodge, Blueberry Ash, and Iluka Resort Apartments.

The southern Palm Beach section includes the southern  of beach, which curves to the southeast in the southern Kiddies Corner. It receives increasing protection from Little Head with waves decreasing in height down the beach. Rips usually extend all the way to the head, though usually smaller in size, with a weak permanent rip against the southern rocks.

History

Origin of the name
The southern end of the Palm Beach is marked as Cabbage Tree Boat Harbour on a map of 1832. Palm Beach was later named after the Cabbage Tree palms Livistona australis that were near Cabbage Tree Boat Harbour. The plant's species name gave origin to Livistona Lane, off Palm Beach Road.

European settlement
Governor Philip explored the area in 1788, and named the headland 'Barrenjuee', which was an indigenous word apparently meaning 'young kangaroo'. In 1816, Palm Beach, Barrenjoey and most of Whale Beach was granted to James Napper. During the 19th century, a few Europeans and Chinese lived at Snapperman Beach catching and drying fish. The Southern end of the ocean beach is marked as Cabbage Tree Boat Harbour on a map of 1832. Palm Beach was later named after the Cabbage Tree palms Livistona australis.

In 1900 all land, except Barrenjoey Headland, which had been purchased by the government in 1881, was divided into 18 large blocks, listed as good grazing land, and offered for sale. None sold. In 1912, the land was offered again in smaller residential blocks, offering fishing, sailing, golf and rowing. Most houses were built from local sandstone, other materials were shipped in. Some were guest houses but most were second homes for those who could afford them.

Palm Beach wharf was the terminus reached by boat from Newport or Bayview. Hordern and Wiltshire Parks and Mackay Reserve were donated by RJ Hordern, who lived at Kalua, opposite the beach. Since World War II the area has become more residential but still remains a secluded peninsula at the northern point of Pittwater.

Timeline of history
 Aboriginal inhabitants in area – Garigal clan of Guringai speaking people. Lands extended from Broken Bay to Port Jackson and to Lane Cove.
 1770 – Captain Cook names Broken Bay.
 1788–1789 – Area explored by Governor Arthur Phillip and Captain John Hunter
 1788 – Arthur Phillip (1738–1814) 2 March 1788, named "Barrenjuee" (Little Kangaroo or Wallaby). Barrenjoey has had at least 9 different names.
 1806 – A sole ship wreck survivor is rescued by Aboriginals in Broken Bay.
 1816 Land grant  to Surgeon James Napper RN by Governor Macquarie (1761–1824) – Headland to Whale Beach, 8/- pa.
 1804 – Pat Flynn had a large garden below Observation Pt (facing Pittwater south of golf course) to supply passing ships.
 1825 – John Howard, an emancipist who arrived on the first fleet in 1788 lives at Barrenjoey in a cottage with two other fishermen.
 1843 – Customs Station set up under John B Howard. Near ranger's cottage. Constructed Smugglers Track. Smuggling of rum, brandy, tobacco. Today drugs & narcotics.
 1840 – Albert Black (1840–1890) becomes customs officer and adopted grandson of merchant Simeon Lord famous in early Sydney.
 1842 – Four Convicts build a Customs house at Barrenjoey and build a track to the headland.
 1855 – A navigation light is established on the headland.
 1863 – A Chinese fishing settlement is established at Snappermans Beach.
 1881 – Government repurchased headland for £1250 from the Wentworth family.
 1881 – A stone lighthouse and three cottages are built according to the designs of Colonial Architect James Barnet.
 1893 – A school is established at Palm Beach.
 1911 – Palm Beach is subdivided and an extension to Customs house is built.
 1912 – Telephone is connected to Palm Beach.
 1916–1919 The oldest bungalows were built at Palm Beach during this period.
 1921 – Palm Beach Surf Lifesaving Club is established.
 1976 – Customs House burnt down.
 1978 – Mel Gibson stars in the movie "Tim" filmed mostly at Barrenjoey Customs House (1911)
 1988–present – Palm Beach is the location of exterior scenes for Summer Bay, the fictional coastal town featured in the long-running soap opera Home and Away.
 2004–2005 – Construction of a Museum and a Public Toilet next to the lighthouse.
 2013 – A fire engulfs the Barrenjoey headland 28 September 2013, threatening to destroy the heritage listed headland. It is contained by local firefighters and no damage to infrastructure was sustained. The bush has slowly recovered.

Many historic images of Pittwater and Palm Beach may be found at Pittwater online news: Historic Record of Pittwater

Heritage listings 
Palm Beach has a number of heritage-listed sites, including:
 Barrenjoey Headland: Barrenjoey Head Lighthouse

Commercial area
Facilities in Palm Beach include a milk bar, a large RSL, hairdresser, beautician, preschool, and a number of cafes, restaurants, and bed and breakfast establishments.

Schools
The nearest primary school and high school for people residing in Palm Beach are the Avalon Public School – which is a co-educational primary school catering for students K–6 and Barrenjoey High School – which is a co-educational high school catering for students 7–12. Both are state-funded, public schools. There is also Maria Regina – which is a co-educational Catholic primary school catering for students K–6.

Transport
Palm Beach Seaplanes operate seaplane services from Palm Beach to Rose Bay in Sydney's Eastern Suburbs, Cottage Point and Berowra Waters. Palm Beach Water Airport is located at the north end of Governor Phillip Drive and Golf Drive, just south of the headland. The Palm Beach Ferry runs a service from a wharf in the town centre to Ettalong, Great Mackerel Beach, Currawong Beach, Coasters Retreat and The Basin.

Palm Beach and Hawkesbury River Cruises runs a ferry service from Palm Beach wharf to Patonga. Barrenjoey Road provides access by bus or car. Bus route 199 operated by Keolis Downer Northern Beaches operates to Manly wharf.

Sport and recreation
Palm Beach has a number of parks, beaches, and sporting areas, including part of the Ku-ring-gai Chase National Park, and the beach which gives the area its name. Careel Bay Ovals Sporting Complex includes facilities for rugby league, soccer and tennis.

Palm Beach has a golf club, sailing club, surf school and two surf lifesaving clubs. The North Palm Beach Surf Life Saving Club, is used as a set for television soap opera Home and Away and has 'Summer Bay Surf Club' painted on the beach side. Palm Beach Surf Life Saving Club, founded in 1921 (at the south end of the beach), is patrolled by paid surf lifesavers on weekdays during summer and by volunteers from the Palm Beach SLSC on weekends. The Surf Club is one of the biggest in NSW, with members coming from all over Sydney. The beach also attracts rock climbers, due to there being two sandstone boulders with highly featured vertical and overhanging features allowing for bouldering.

Clubs
 Avalon Soccer Club
 Avalon Rugby League Club
 Cabbage Tree Club
 Careel Bay Tennis Club
 North Palm Beach Surf Life Saving Club
 Pacific Club
 Palm Beach Golf Club
 Palm Beach Sailing Club
 Palm Beach Surf Life Saving Club

In Popular Culture
 Palm Beach (2019 Film)
 Palm Beach (1980 Film)
 Palm Beach Road is referred to in the lyrics of the song "Deep Water" by Australian singer-songwriter Richard Clapton.
 The music video for Train on a Track by Kelly Rowland was filmed here.
 Palm Beach has been used as the location for the town of Summer Bay in the TV series Home and Away.

See also

List of Sydney suburbs

References

Further reading

 

 
Suburbs of Sydney
Surfing locations in New South Wales
Beaches of New South Wales
Northern Beaches Council